Ray Sparenberg was a host of early horror movies from 1958 to 1963 as a character called Selwin, on WISH-TV in Indianapolis, Indiana.

One of the earliest hosts of the new rash of B-movies flooding the U.S. in the 1950s and 60s, Sparenberg later hosted different film themes as other characters such as an astronaut and safari hunter at WISH-TV.

External links
https://www.webcitation.org/query?url=http://www.geocities.com/TelevisionCity/3257/Selwin.html&date=2009-10-25+11:06:41 TV Horror Hosts' webpage on Selwin
http://www.historiccolumbusindiana.org/whatwewatched/whatwewatched.asp a history site with Selwin images and description

Horror hosts
Year of birth missing
Year of death missing
People from Indianapolis